Nicolae Ungureanu (born 11 October 1956) is a Romanian former professional footballer who played as a defender.

Career
He was born in Craiova and debuted in Divizia A with Universitatea Craiova in 1977. He spent ten seasons with Universitatea, winning the league titles in 1980 and 1981. In 1987, he was transferred to Steaua București, where he helped win the league in 1988 and 1989. He played in the 1988/89 European Cup Final against AC Milan, when Steaua lost 4–0. His last Divizia A match came for Rapid București in 1993. The game ended in a 0–5 loss against Universitatea Craiova.

Ungureanu got 56 caps and scored 1 goal for the Romania national team, and represented his country at Euro 1984. He played in 71 European Cup matches, scoring one goal.

Honours

Player
Universitatea Craiova
Divizia A: 1979–80, 1980–81
Romanian Cup:  1977–78, 1980–81, 1982–83, 1992–93
Steaua București
Divizia A: 1987–88, 1988–89
Romanian Cup: 1988–89
European Cup runner-up: 1988–89

Notes

References

External links
 Nicolae Ungureanu profile
 

1956 births
Living people
Sportspeople from Craiova
Romanian footballers
Olympic footballers of Romania
Liga I players
Liga II players
CS Universitatea Craiova players
FC Steaua București players
FC Rapid București players
CS Pandurii Târgu Jiu managers
Romania international footballers
UEFA Euro 1984 players
University of Craiova alumni
Association football defenders
Romanian football managers